Julia Efremova née Vorobieva (born 14 February 1985 in Kursk) is a former Russian tennis player. She played under her maiden name of Vorobieva (aka Vorobeva) until February 2006. She married her coach Alexey Efremov and returned to the circuit in March 2007.

In her career, Efremova won eleven titles on the ITF Circuit, one in singles and ten in doubles.

Career
She has played on the qualifying draws of WTA Tour tournaments on many occasions. Her career-high singles ranking was world No. 285, which she achieved on 14 November 2005, and her highest doubles ranking No. 193, achieved on 20 February 2006.

In 2003, Julia tried to qualify for her first WTA event in Moscow, but fell to Anastasia Rodionova in the first round. In 2005, she played the qualifying draws of five tournaments (Pattaya, Hyderabad, Beijing, Guangzhou and Tashkent) but was unsuccessful in each.

In 2006, she tried qualifying in Bangalore, but was overpowered in round one by Daniela Kix. In 2007, she fell in the qualifying draws of Kolkata and Moscow, losing to Sandy Gumulya and Oxana Lyubtsova, respectively.

Julia's biggest title of her career was winning the Busan Challenger doubles event in 2005. She won the title with Wynne Prakusya, defeating Seiko Okamoto and Ayami Takase in the final. Her only singles title came in 2004 at Jakarta where she won an $10k event.

ITF Circuit finals

Singles: 1 (1 title)

Doubles: 15 (10 titles, 5 runner-ups)

References
 
 ITF Player Profile

Living people
1985 births
Sportspeople from Kursk
Russian female tennis players
21st-century Russian women
20th-century Russian women